Protepicorsia costalis is a moth in the family Crambidae. It was described by Paul Dognin in 1903. It is found in Loja Province, Ecuador.

References

Moths described in 1903
Pyraustinae